Geothermal energy in Italy is mainly used for electric power production.

Italy is located above a relatively thin crust, with four large areas of underground heat:
 the first is Tuscany, with the Larderello fields.
 the second is in Campania, the Phlegraean Fields
 the third, very large and not fully explored, in the south of the Tyrrhenian Sea
 the fourth is the Strait of Sicily, around the undersea Empedocles volcano and Lampedusa Island

A 2018 report by the Italian Geothermal Union indicated that Italy has additional geothermal energy potential which has yet to be utilized.

Exploration
Research into the potential for geothermal energy started in 1977, following the oil crisis, with work of ENEL and ENI, which started jointly to bore hundreds of wells in Italy, creating a complete map of the underground resource. But in the '90s, the exploratory activity stopped.

Following results a mapping of Italy in four areas:

 very high potential, with water of more than  temperature at less than 3 km depth; area extends from NW-SE of Genoa to the Aeolian Islands.
 low potential, no commercial utilization at less than 3 km depth.

Electric power production

Thermal applications 
Italy uses its lower temperature fluids for spas, agriculture, industry and district heating. A large portion of house heating is concentrated in the Abano spa area, in northeast Italy. As district heating the most important plants are in Ferrara and Vicenza in the eastern Po Valley, about 1990. Smaller district heating plants are found in Bagno di Romagna and Acqui Terme.

See also

Geothermal power in Italy
Hydrothermal vent
Earth's internal heat budget

References

External links
Italy, Think GeoEnergy
Geothermal in Italy, World Energy Council

 
Sustainable energy
Volcanism